The Neptuneinae are  taxonomic subfamily of large sea snails, often known as whelks.

Genera
 Aulacofusus Dall, 1918
 Neptunea Röding, 1798
Synonyms
 Barbitonia Dall, 1916 accepted as Neptunea (Barbitonia) Dall, 1916 represented as Neptunea Röding, 1798
 Chrysodomus Swainson, 1840 accepted as Neptunea Röding, 1798 (junior synonym)
 Costaria Golikov, 1977 accepted as Neptunea Röding, 1798
 Golikovia Habe & Sato, 1973 accepted as Neptunea (Golikovia) Habe & Sato, 1973 accepted as Neptunea Röding, 1798
 Neptunia Locard, 1886 accepted as Neptunea Röding, 1798 (unjustified emendation)

References

External links
 Stimpson, W. (1865). On certain genera and families of zoophagous gasteropods. American Journal of Conchology. 1: 55-64, pl. 8-9
 Dall, W.H. (1870). Revision of the classification of the Mollusca of Massachusetts. Proceedings of the Boston Society of Natural History. 13: 240-257
 Kantor, Y.I., Fedosov, A.E., Kosyan, A.R., Puillandre, N., Sorokin, P.A., Kano, Y., Clark, R. N. & Bouchet, P. (2022 [nomenclatural availability: 2021). Molecular phylogeny and revised classification of the Buccinoidea (Neogastropoda). Zoological Journal of the Linnean Society. 194: 789-857.]

Buccinidae